Destin Dwane Hood (born April 3, 1990) is an American former professional baseball outfielder. He played in Major League Baseball (MLB) for the Miami Marlins. He currently serves as a development coach for the FCL Nationals.

Career
Hood attended St. Paul's Episcopal School in Mobile, Alabama, where he played on the baseball and football team. In football, he was ranked by Rivals.com as a four-star recruit and was committed to the University of Alabama to play college football for the Crimson Tide.

Washington Nationals
Hood was drafted by the Washington Nationals in the second round of the 2008 Major League Baseball Draft. He signed with the Nationals, forgoing football at Alabama. He made his professional debut that season for the Gulf Coast Nationals. Hood spent 2009 with Gulf Coast and the Vermont Lake Monsters. He spent 2010 with the Hagerstown Suns and 2011 with the Potomac Nationals. In 2012, he played for the Auburn Doubledays and Harrisburg Senators. In 2013, he returned to Harrisburg. After returning to Harrisburg for a third straight year in 2014, he was promoted to the Syracuse Chiefs early in the season.

Cleveland Indians
On December 12, 2014, Hood signed a minor league deal with the Cleveland Indians organization. He was released on July 15, 2015.

Philadelphia Phillies
On July 17, 2015, signed a minor league deal with the Philadelphia Phillies. He elected free agency on November 7, 2015.

Miami Marlins
Hood signed with the Miami Marlins organization for the 2016 season. The Marlins promoted Hood to the major leagues on September 1, 2016. He recorded his first career hit with a 5th inning double off of Indians pitcher Carlos Carrasco He was outrighted to AAA on October 7, 2017. He elected free agency on November 6, 2017.

Texas Rangers
Hood signed a minor league contract with the Texas Rangers on January 4, 2018, with an invite to spring training. He played for the Triple-A Round Rock Express and Double-A Frisco RoughRiders, and elected free agency after the season.

Lancaster Barnstormers
On February 13, 2019, Hood signed with the Lancaster Barnstormers of the independent Atlantic League of Professional Baseball. He became a free agent following the season. Hood re-signed with the Barnstormers on March 2, 2020. Hood did not play in a game for Lancaster in 2020 due to the cancellation of the Atlantic League season because of the COVID-19 pandemic. He became a free agent after the year.

Washington Nationals (second stint)
On May 12, 2021, Hood signed a minor league contract with the Washington Nationals organization. He elected free agency on November 7, 2021.

Coaching career
On January 18, 2022, it was announced that Hood had been hired by the Washington Nationals organization to serve as a development coach for the FCL Nationals.

References

External links

Living people
1990 births
Sportspeople from Mobile, Alabama
Baseball players from Alabama
Major League Baseball outfielders
Miami Marlins players
Gulf Coast Nationals players
Vermont Lake Monsters players
Hagerstown Suns players
Potomac Nationals players
Harrisburg Senators players
Auburn Doubledays players
Syracuse Chiefs players
Columbus Clippers players
Akron RubberDucks players
Reading Fightin Phils players
New Orleans Zephyrs players
New Orleans Baby Cakes players
Round Rock Express players
Frisco RoughRiders players
Lancaster Barnstormers players